Xavier Escaich Ferrer (born 6 September 1968) is a former Spanish footballer who played as a forward.

Club career
Escaich began playing youth football for hometown club UE Castelldefels, before moving to CF Gavà and CF Blanca Subur.

In 1987, Escaich began his senior career with Gimnàstic in the Segunda División B, scoring 25 goals in 36 games. A year later, Escaich joined Hospitalet, before signing for Primera División club Espanyol. Escaich stayed at Espanyol for five seasons, joining Primera División club Sporting Gijón in 1993. In 1994, Escaich joined Barcelona as a replacement for departing forward Julio Salinas. Escaich found opportunities at Barcelona limited under manager Johan Cruyff, playing just three league games, and despite featuring for the club in pre-season the following season, Escaich was sold to Albacete following the signing of Meho Kodro. Escaich played for Albacete for two seasons, before signing for Real Murcia, retiring at the club due to an ankle injury.

International career
Escaich represented Catalonia twice, scoring once.

References

1968 births
Living people
Spanish footballers
Footballers from Catalonia
Catalonia international footballers
Association football forwards
Gimnàstic de Tarragona footballers
CE L'Hospitalet players
RCD Espanyol footballers
Sporting de Gijón players
FC Barcelona players
Albacete Balompié players
Real Murcia players
La Liga players
Segunda División players
Segunda División B players
People from Castelldefels
Sportspeople from the Province of Barcelona